Hot R&B/Hip-Hop Songs is a chart published by Billboard that ranks the top-performing songs in the United States in African-American-oriented musical genres; the chart has undergone various name changes since its launch in 1942 to reflect the evolution of such genres.  In 1967, it was published under the title Top Selling R&B Singles.  During that year, 14 different singles topped the chart, based on playlists submitted by radio stations and surveys of retail sales outlets.

The most successful artist of the year in chart terms was Aretha Franklin, who spent seven weeks at number one between March and May with "I Never Loved a Man (The Way I Love You)", and after a single week out of the top spot returned to the top of the chart with "Respect", which spent eight weeks in the peak position.  Later in the year, Franklin gained her third chart-topper of the year with "Baby I Love You", which held the top spot for two weeks, giving the singer a total of 17 weeks at number one during 1967, more than double the figure achieved by any other act.  Franklin had first charted in 1961, but her career did not fully take off until she joined Atlantic Records in 1966, after which she quickly became one of the biggest stars not only in black music but across all genres.  She is regarded by some as one of the greatest singers of all time and nicknamed the "Queen of Soul".

Franklin was among a number of acts to reach number one for the first time in 1967.  Aaron Neville achieved the same feat when he moved into the number one position in the issue of Billboard dated January 7 with "Tell It Like It Is", and later in the year Freddie Scott and Bettye Swann each gained their first and only chart-topper with "Are You Lonely for Me" and "Make Me Yours" respectively.  The year's final number one was "I Heard It Through the Grapevine" by Gladys Knight & the Pips, which reached the top spot in the issue of Billboard dated December 2 and stayed there for the remainder of the year.  It was the first of two versions of the song to top the chart in a little over a year; Marvin Gaye would take his version of the song to number one in December 1968.  Two of 1967's rhythm & blues number ones also topped the all-genre Hot 100 chart: "Love Is Here and Now You're Gone" by the Supremes and "Respect" by Aretha Franklin. The Supremes also topped the Hot 100 with "The Happening", but that single failed to even enter the top 10 of the R&B listing.

Chart history

References

1967
1967 record charts
1967 in American music